Vingtaine des Augrès is one of the five vingtaines of Trinity in the Channel Island of Jersey.

References

Vingtaines of Jersey
Trinity, Jersey
Category:Vingtaines of Jersey